David Krause (born 28 February 1970) is a former professional rugby league footballer who played for South Queensland Crushers in the Australian Rugby League and London Broncos in the Super League.

After retiring, Krause moved into coaching and took charge at Lismore Marist Brothers Rams in the Northern Rivers Regional Rugby League.

David currently is living in Brisbane, coaching the East Tigers Under 20 (2013–2014).

References

External links
 Statistics at Rugby League Project

1970 births
Rugby league centres
South Queensland Crushers players
London Broncos players
Australian rugby league coaches
Australian rugby league players
Rugby league players from Sydney
Living people